Sepanta Communication Development is an Iranian Internet service provider. This private company has been held in 1998 by providing dial-up Internet for home users in Tehran. Sepanta is a medium Local Internet registry
Sepanta expanding its services to keep its position as the best Iranian profile-based service provider.

Offices and Coverage
Sepanta has five offices at the following cities: Esfahan, Pardis, Shiraz, Tabriz and Yazd.

Achievements
Sepanta website achieved first place among Internet Service Provider websites in 4th Iranian Web Festival.

Competition
According to United Nations' report on Post Report of Iran, ParsOnline along with Afranet and Neda are in major competition in VOIP services and Sepanta raised into competition later.
Sepanta is in major competition with Afranet, ParsOnline, Shatel and Neda Rayaneh  and other local ISPs

References

External links
 Official Site

Telecommunications companies established in 2003
Internet service providers of Iran
Privately held companies of Iran
2003 establishments in Iran
Companies based in Tehran